Grand Lake is Colorado's largest and deepest natural lake.  It is located in the headwaters of the Colorado River in Grand County, Colorado. On its north shore is located the historic and eponymous town of Grand Lake. The lake was formed during the Pinedale glaciation, which occurred from 30000 BP (before present) to 10000 BP. The glacial terminal moraine created a natural dam. Natural tributaries to the lake are the North Inlet and East Inlet, both of which flow out of Rocky Mountain National Park, which surrounds the lake on three sides. Grand Lake is located 1 mile from the Park's western entrance. Grand Lake was named Spirit Lake by the Ute Tribe because they believed the lake's cold waters to be the dwelling place of departed souls.

Colorado-Big Thompson Project
As part of the Colorado-Big Thompson Project,
Grand Lake forms a continuous body of water with the man-made reservoir Shadow Mountain Lake, which under natural conditions then flows into another man-made reservoir, Lake Granby. When the Colorado-Big Thompson (C-BT) project is diverting water to northeastern Colorado, water collected in Lake Granby can be pumped back into Shadow Mountain where it flows backward into Grand Lake, then under Rocky Mountain National Park and the Continental Divide via the Alva B. Adams Tunnel to the Big Thompson River on the eastern slope of the Rocky Mountains. From there, the water flows into the South Platte River and is used for agriculture, municipal, and industrial purposes. Diverted C-BT water provides hydroelectric power to five power stations on the eastern slope of the Colorado Rockies.

The C-BT is one of the first of many large-scale diversions of water from the Colorado River Basin between Colorado and the Gulf of California. Because the C-BT Project moves water from the Colorado Basin to the South Platte Basin (on a larger scale, from the Colorado River, which drains to the Gulf of California, to the Mississippi River, which drains to the Gulf of Mexico), the project is considered a transbasin diversion.

References

External links

U.S. Bureau of Reclamation website on Colorado-Big Thompson Project
Map of Grand Lake Village
Grand Lake Area Events 
Grand County Water Information Network
Town of Grand Lake Homepage
Grand Lake Chamber Homepage
Grand County Government Homepage
Arapaho National Recreation Area website
Colorado County Evolution by Don Stanwyck
Colorado Historical Society
Grand County Library District website
Grand County Tourism Board website
National Register of Historic Places listing for Grand County
Rocky Mountain National Park website

Lakes of Colorado
Lakes of Grand County, Colorado
Religious places of the indigenous peoples of North America
Sacred lakes
Grand Lake, Colorado